Brangane can refer to:

606 Brangäne, an asteroid orbiting the sun
A character from Tristan und Isolde

See also
Brangaine